Leslie Clark can refer to:

 Leslie Clark (umpire) (1903–1974), New Zealand cricket umpire
 Leslie Clark (cricketer) (born 1930), New Zealand cricketer and son of the umpire